The Florida State League Manager of the Year Award is an annual award given to the best manager in minor league baseball's Florida State League. In 2004, Omar Malavé won the first ever Florida State League Manager of the Year Award. Malavé is also the only manager to have won the award multiple times (2004, 2008, and 2014).

Five managers from the Dunedin Blue Jays have been selected for the Manager of the Year Award, more than any other teams in the league, followed by the Fort Myers Mighty Mussels (3); the St. Lucie Mets and Tampa Yankees (2); the Bradenton Marauders, Brevard County Manatees, Charlotte Stone Crabs, Clearwater Threshers, Lakeland Tigers, and Palm Beach Cardinals (1).

Five managers from the Toronto Blue Jays Major League Baseball (MLB) organization have won the Manager of the Year Award, more than any other, followed by the Minnesota Twins organization (3); the New York Mets and New York Yankees organizations (2); and the Detroit Tigers, Milwaukee Brewers, Philadelphia Phillies, Pittsburgh Pirates, St. Louis Cardinals, and Tampa Bay Rays organizations (1).

Key

Winners

Notes
The Finish column indicates final position in the divisional standings.
The Record column indicates wins and losses during the regular season and excludes any post-season play.

References
General

Specific

Man
Minor league baseball coaching awards
Awards established in 2004
2004 establishments in Florida